Zambia competed at the 2022 Commonwealth Games in Birmingham, England between 28 July and 8 August 2022. It was Zambia's fifteenth appearance at the Games.

Muzala Samukonga and Margret Tembo were the country's opening ceremony flagbearers.

Medalists

Competitors
The following is the list of number of competitors participating at the Games per sport/discipline.

Athletics

A squad of six athletes was confirmed as of 2 July 2022.

Men
Track and road events

Women
Track and road events

Badminton

As of 1 June 2022, Zambia qualified for the mixed team event via the BWF World Rankings.

Singles

Doubles

Mixed team

Summary

Squad

Ogar Siamupangila
Elizaberth Chipeleme
Chongo Mulenga
Kalombo Mulenga

Group stage

Boxing

A squad of four boxers was confirmed as of 2 July 2022.

Cycling

A squad of two cyclists was confirmed as of 2 July 2022.

Road

Mountain bike

Judo

A squad of five judoka was confirmed as of 2 July 2022.

Para powerlifting

As of 23 May 2022, Zambia qualified one powerlifter.

Rugby sevens

As of 24 April 2022, Zambia qualified for the men's tournament. This was achieved through their position in the 2022 Africa Men's Sevens.

The thirteen-man roster was officially named as of 2 July 2022.

Summary

Men's tournament

Roster
 
Israel Kalumba (c)
Edmond Hamayuwa
Laston Mukosa
Davy Chimbukulu
Larry Kaushiku
Elisha Bwalya
Mike Masabo
Brian Mbalwe
Rodgers Mukupa
Alex Mwewa
Chisanga Nkoma
Michello Sheleni
Melvin Banda

Pool C

Classification Quarterfinals

13th-16th Semifinals

Squash

A squad of two players was confirmed as of 2 July 2022.

Swimming

A squad of four swimmers was confirmed as of 2 July 2022.

Men

Women

Mixed

References

External links
Commonwealth Games Association of Zambia Official site

Nations at the 2022 Commonwealth Games
Zambia at the Commonwealth Games
Commonwealth Games